This Is the Christ is a studio album by the Mormon Tabernacle Choir.  The Mormon Tabernacle Choir and Orchestra at Temple Square combine their talents to create this one-of-a-kind collection of music that bears witness of the Lord and Savior, Jesus Christ.  Featuring songs never before recorded by the Choir, as well as familiar favorites, the album reached #1 on the Billboard Christian Albums chart on July 2, 2011.

Album information

Track listing

Charts

Year-end charts

References

Tabernacle Choir albums
2011 albums